Lucie van Dam van Isselt or Lucie Dam van Isselt later Lucie Ekker (15 June 1871 – 7 June 1949) was a Dutch artist known for her floral paintings.

Life
Van Dam van Isselt was born in Bergen op Zoom, North Brabant, Netherlands in 1871. Her formal painting education began at the Royal Academy of Visual Arts in The Hague.

She traveled through Europe and painted in various places in Belgium, France and Italy. Her oeuvre is varied: portraits, various types of still lifes, genre, figure and animal performances. The Flemish neo-impressionist painter Théo van Rysselberghe was an inspiration for her.

Van Dam van Isselt was the subject of a portrait by Jan Toorop in 1905.

She has paintings in several collections including the Teylers Museum. Isselt's work was included in the 1939 exhibition and sale Onze Kunst van Heden (Our Art of Today) at the Rijksmuseum in Amsterdam.

She married, and divorced, twice. She married in her home town in 1892 to the painter and mechanical engineer . They divorced in 1907 after they had had two children. She remarried on 12 May 1909 in Utrecht to the art critic . Their marriage was dissolved in 1921.

Van Dam van Isselt died in The Hague in 1949.

References

External link

1871 births
1949 deaths
19th-century Dutch women artists
20th-century Dutch women artists
Dutch women painters
People from Bergen op Zoom